Jin In-chol (born 2 February 1948) is a North Korean former footballer. He competed in the men's tournament at the 1976 Summer Olympics.

References

External links
 
 

1948 births
Living people
North Korean footballers
North Korea international footballers
Olympic footballers of North Korea
Footballers at the 1976 Summer Olympics
Place of birth missing (living people)
Association football goalkeepers